Play is the eighth studio album by Japanese pop singer Namie Amuro, released on June 27, 2007 in Japan. The follow-up to her successful 2005 album Queen of Hip-Pop, Play showcases her new hip-pop genre. It marks her first album to be released in both the CD and CD+DVD formats. Play is her highest selling album since 2000's Genius 2000. The album was ranked 9th on CDJapan's list of top 100 CDs of 2007.

Overview
Upon its release, Play debuted at #1 and stayed at the top spot for two weeks on the Oricon Charts. When its first week was over, Play became Namie's first weekly number one album since her 2000 album Genius 2000 with a gap of 120,258 copies sold. In its first week, the album sold 250,619 copies — Namie's highest first week sales since Genius 2000. In Taiwan, Play reached #1 on the G-Music J-Pop chart for the week and debuted at #2 on the overall chart.

Tie-ins/theme songs
 "Violet Sauce" from the lead single of the album, "White Light/Violet Sauce", was the theme song for the Japanese release of the major motion picture Sin City.
 "Can't Sleep, Can't Eat, I'm Sick" was used in commercials for the ringtone sites Mu-Mo and Iromelo Mix DX, the former of which is endorsed by her record label.
 "Baby Don't Cry" is the ending theme song for the Kansai/Fuji TV drama, Himitsu no Hanazono. It was also used for JoySound commercials.
 "Funky Town" is used for Lipton Limone commercials.
 "Top Secret" is being used as the theme song for the second season of Prison Break in Japan.
 "Pink Key" was the theme song of a commercial for Lipton's Chiffon Milk Tea.

Track listing

Personnel
 Namie Amuro - vocals, background vocals
 Hiromi - additional vocals
 Nao'ymt - additional vocals, multiple instruments
 Michico - additional vocals
 Sam Salter - additional vocals
 T.Kura - multiple instruments
 Orito - additional vocals
 Tiger - additional vocals
 LL Brothers - additional vocals
 Warner - additional vocals
 Jun - additional vocals
 Ring - additional vocals
 Tomoyasu Takeuchi - guitars

Production
 Producers - Nao'ymt, T.Kura, Namie Amuro
 Vocal Producers - Michico, Angie Irons
 Mixing - D.O.I., T.Kura, Yoshiaki Onishi
 Creative Direction - Hidekazu Sato
 Art Direction - Hidekazu Sato, Katsuhiro Shimizu
 Design - Katsuhiro Shimizu
 Photography - Shoji Uchida
 Stylist - Noriko Goto

Charts

Sales total

Oricon

 re-charting on Christmas week

Physical sales charts

Singles - Oricon Sales Chart (Japan)

Total Single Sales: 444,081

Total Album and Single Sales: 985,033

RIAJ certification
Play has been certified "double-platinum" for shipments of over 500,000 by the Recording Industry Association of Japan.

References

External links
 http://www.g-music.com.tw/GMusicBillboard0.aspx
 http://www.g-music.com.tw/GMusicBillboard3.aspx

2007 albums
Namie Amuro albums
Avex Group albums